The True Path Party, abbreviated to DYP, is a centre-right, conservative Turkish political party, established by the lawyer Çetin Özaçıkgöz in 2007. It got 0.15% of the votes in the general elections of 2011.

It is not to be confused with the True Path Party founded in 1983 by Ahmet Nusret Tuna, which was renamed to Democratic Party in 2007.

See also
Politics of Turkey
List of political parties in Turkey
Democratic Party (Turkey, current)

References

External links
True Path Party official website 

1983 establishments in Turkey
Liberal conservative parties in Turkey
Political parties established in 1983
Political parties in Turkey